Robert Thornton (born 17 February 1941) is an Australian former sailor who competed in the 1972 Summer Olympics.

References

1941 births
Living people
Australian male sailors (sport)
Olympic sailors of Australia
Sailors at the 1972 Summer Olympics – Tempest